Wycombe Wanderers Football Club  is an English professional association football club based in the town of High Wycombe, Buckinghamshire. The team compete in League One, the third tier of the English football league system. They play their home matches at Adams Park, located on the western outskirts of High Wycombe.

Founded in 1887, they entered the Southern League in 1896. They switched to the Great Western Suburban League in 1908 and then the Spartan League in 1919, before joining the Isthmian League after winning the Spartan League in 1919–20 and 1920–21. They spent 64 years in the Isthmian League, winning eight league titles and one FA Amateur Cup title. Having rejected numerous invitations to join the Alliance Premier League (now National League), they finally accepted an offer in 1985 and eventually found success in the fifth tier of English football under the management of Martin O'Neill, winning promotion into the Football League as Football Conference champions in 1992–93. They also lifted the FA Trophy in 1991 and 1993, and won the Conference League Cup, Conference Shield (three times) and Conference Charity Shield.

Wycombe made an immediate impact in the Football League, winning promotion out of the Third Division via the play-offs in 1994. They spent a decade in the third tier and reached the FA Cup semi-finals in 2001, though were relegated three years later. They also reached the League Cup semi-finals in 2007 and then gained promotion out of League Two in 2008–09. This was the first of four successive seasons of promotions and relegations between League Two and League One, which was followed by a decline that saw the club only avoid relegation into non-League on goal difference in 2014. The club secured promotion out of League Two in 2017–18 under the stewardship of Gareth Ainsworth, who then took the club to the Championship for the first time in the club's history with victory in the 2020 League One play-off final. The subsequent season in the Championship proved difficult for Wycombe, and despite a late run of form which produced five wins and a draw from their last eight games, they were relegated back to League One at the end of the season.

History

Formation and early years (1887–1921)
The exact details of the formation of Wycombe Wanderers F.C. have largely been lost to history. A group of young furniture trade workers started a team to play matches which led to a meeting, held at the Steam Engine public house in Station Road, High Wycombe in 1887 which saw the formation of Wycombe Wanderers F.C. It is highly likely the club was named Wanderers after the famous Wanderers, winners of the first FA Cup in 1872. The club played friendly matches between 1887 and 1896. It first entered the FA Amateur Cup in 1894 and the FA Cup in 1895. In 1895 the club moved to Loakes Park, which would become its home for the next 95 years. In 1896 the club joined the Southern League and competed in the Second Division until 1908.

In the summer of 1908 the club declined the invitation to retain their membership of the Southern League. The club decided to pursue amateur instead of professional football and joined the Great Western Suburban League and remained there until the outbreak of the First World War. After the hostilities had ended the club joined the Spartan League in 1919 and were Champions in successive years. In March 1921 the club's application to join the Isthmian League was accepted.

Amateur years (1921–1974)
The club remained a member of the Isthmian League until 1985, when they finally accepted promotion to the Alliance Premier League. For over sixty years the Wanderers sought to be the greatest amateur club in the country. One of the club's greatest achievements came in April 1931 when it won the FA Amateur Cup. The Wanderers beat Hayes 1–0 in the final at Highbury, home of Arsenal. The club also reached the first round proper of the FA Cup for the first time in November 1932, losing to Gillingham in a replay at Loakes Park.

The club remained active during the Second World War, competing in the Great Western Combination, which was won in 1945. In 1947 Frank Adams, who had captained the club to its double Championship victories in the Spartan League and made 331 appearances for the Wanderers, scoring 104 goals, made arguably his greatest contribution when he gave Loakes Park to the club. It provided the basis for a period of unprecedented success in 1950s.

The club appointed Sid Cann as coach in 1952 and he led the Wanderers to their first Isthmian League title in 1956. The title was successfully defended the following season, and the club also reached Wembley for the first time in their history. They were beaten 3–1 by Bishop Auckland in the final of the FA Amateur Cup in April 1957. Their North-East rivals were something of a nemesis having also beaten the Chairboys at the semi-final stage in both 1950 and 1955. The second round proper of the FA Cup was reached in December 1959 when the club was defeated 5–1 by Watford at Vicarage Road. The stars of the team included winger Len Worley and striker Paul Bates.

Cann left the club to join Norwich City in 1961 and the club's fortunes took something of a downturn during the 1960s. That changed in December 1968 when Brian Lee was appointed as the club's first conventional manager. He changed several aspects of the club including team selection, which up to that point had been chosen by committee. He led the Wanderers to a third Isthmian League title in 1971 and it was again defended successfully in 1972. The club suffered yet more FA Amateur Cup disappointment at the semi-final stage, losing 2–1 to Hendon at Griffin Park, Brentford.

A fifth Isthmian League title was won in 1974 and the following season it was defended yet again, this time by the narrowest of margins, a superior goal difference of 0–1 to Enfield. In the same season the club created history by reaching the third round proper of the FA Cup for the first time, losing 1–0 to First Division Middlesbrough in a replay at Ayresome Park having drawn 0–0 at Loakes Park.

Loss of purpose (1974–1984)
Lee retired as manager in 1976 and again the Wanderers suffered a decline. A significant factor was the abolition of amateur football by the FA in 1974 which left the club without a sense of purpose. The Wanderers rejected the invitation to join the Alliance Premier League on its formation in 1979 and again in 1981 with concern over the increased travelling costs. The club reached the semi-finals of the FA Trophy for the first time in 1982 but lost out to Altrincham. A seventh Isthmian League title was won in 1983 but promotion to the Alliance Premier League was again turned down.

Football League dream (1984–1993)
As a consequence crowds at Loakes Park dropped to record lows and the club decided to accept promotion to the Gola League in 1985, having finished third in the Isthmian League Premier Division. The club's first season in a national league ended in disappointment, with the Wanderers relegated on goal difference. They soon returned after romping to an eighth Isthmian League title in 1987 after a battle with Yeovil Town. The club consolidated their place in the newly named GM Vauxhall Conference and under manager Jim Kelman they finished in fourth place in 1989. The following season would be the club's last at their Loakes Park home. It was a disappointing season on the field with Kelman being asked to resign following an ignominious defeat to the Metropolitan Police in the FA Trophy.

The club appointed Martin O'Neill as his successor and he went on to lead the Wanderers to unprecedented success. The club moved to its new Adams Park home in 1990, and in May 1991, the Blues defeated Kidderminster Harriers 2–1 in the final of the FA Trophy in front of a then-record crowd. The club narrowly missed out on promotion to the Football League the following season, finishing level on 94 points with Colchester United, but placing second in the league on goal difference.

Football League (1993–2000)
The club recovered to become only the third in history to do the non-league double. The Wanderers claimed the 92–93 Conference title before winning the FA Trophy again, beating Runcorn 4–1 in the final at Wembley in May 1993. O'Neill rejected the chance to manage Nottingham Forest that summer, staying with Wycombe to lead the club to fourth in the Third Division and qualify for the play-offs in their inaugural season in the Football League. They beat Carlisle United in the two-legged semi-final, and beat Preston North End 4–2 in the final at Wembley in May 1994 to secure their second consecutive promotion, entering the Second Division (the third tier) for the first time in club history.

In their first season in the Second Division, Wycombe finished sixth, but due to league re-organisation, missed out on a play-off place, and O'Neill left to become manager of First Division Norwich City in June 1995. Former Crystal Palace manager Alan Smith was appointed as his successor, but was sacked in September 1996 as Wycombe struggled in the bottom half of the Second Division. John Gregory took over and managed to steer the club to safety on the penultimate weekend of the 96–97 season. He left to manage Aston Villa in February 1998 and youth team boss Neil Smillie was given the job.

Smillie was sacked in January 1999 with the Wanderers looking destined for relegation back to the fourth tier. Lawrie Sanchez was appointed his successor and tasked with keeping the club in the Second Division. Safety was secured on the final day of the season when Paul Emblen headed home the winner seven minutes from time to beat Lincoln City 1–0. In tribute to this result, the club acquired a new mascot, in the form of the Wycombe Comanche.

Cup success and relegation (2000–2006)
In 2000–01, Wycombe began a successful FA Cup run, with wins over First Division sides Grimsby Town, Wolverhampton Wanderers and Wimbledon taking them to a quarter-final with Premiership outfit Leicester City. Striker Roy Essandoh headed an injury-time winner to seal a 2–1 win for the Wanderers at Filbert Street. The semi-final at Villa Park saw Wycombe face Liverpool, and goals from Emile Heskey and Robbie Fowler put the Premiership side up 2–0. A last ditch effort from club mainstay Keith Ryan gave some hope to the Wanderers, but they would exit the competition after succumbing to a 2–1 defeat.

Despite cup success, the club's league form continued to struggle, as they finished 13th in the Second Division in 00–01. As bottom half finishes continued, Sanchez was eventually sacked in September 2003 after the club ended the previous campaign in 18th. His successor Tony Adams failed to turn things around, and Wycombe ended a 10-year stay in the Second Division at the end of 03–04, finishing bottom of the league and suffering relegation to the Third Division, then renamed as the Coca-Cola League Two. At the time, the Wanderers were English football's last professional members' club, but at an extraordinary general meeting in July 2004, the members voted by a narrow margin to restructure the club as a Public Limited Company. Chairman Ivor Beeks, Director Brian Kane and sponsor Steve Hayes all subsequently invested in the club, with an approximate total value of £750,000.

Adams remained in the manager's job for just a year, resigning in November 2004, and John Gorman was appointed as his successor. His tenure saw a record of 21 league games unbeaten at the start of the 2005–06 season. A double tragedy would soon hit the club, however, with midfielder Mark Philo killed in a road accident in January 2006 and Gorman's wife Myra dying of cancer in March. Subsequently, the team's form slipped and they fell from top spot to eventually finish in sixth place, still achieving a playoff spot. Cheltenham Town won the two-legged play-off semi-final 2–1 and Gorman was sacked in May 2006.

Paul Lambert took over in June, and took the club on another ambitious cup run, this time to the semi-finals of the Carling Cup. Having previously never passed the second round, Wycombe defeated Fulham away, and knocked out then Premier League side Charlton Athletic in the quarter-finals. This bought them to a semi-final with reigning Premier League champions Chelsea. The Wanderers drew the first leg 1–1 at Adams Park, with Jermaine Easter scoring a late equaliser after a first half goal from Wayne Bridge. The second leg at Stamford Bridge was a different story, as doubles from both Andriy Shevchenko and Frank Lampard saw Wycombe lose 4–0 and exit the competition. Again, however, the side's league form would suffer, and a number of changes were made to the squad and staff in the summer of 2007. They reached the League Two play-offs in 2008 but were knocked out 2–1 on aggregate by Stockport County. Lambert resigned shortly afterwards.

Yo-yoing between the lower divisions (2006–2012)
Peter Taylor was appointed as his successor in May 2008 and he led the side to another lengthy unbeaten start which lasted 18 games. The side was nine points clear at the top at Christmas but results soon tailed off and the team eventually finished in the last automatic promotion place, ahead of Bury by virtue of a superior goal difference of just one. The summer of 2009 saw Steve Hayes become the first sole owner of the club, converting £3m of loans into equity. He also announced his intention to move the club into a community stadium based on the site of the Wycombe Air Park.

Taylor was sacked in October 2009 after a poor start to the season, and was replaced by Gary Waddock who was unable to save the club from relegation back to League Two. Waddock did however guide the Wanderers straight back to League One at the first attempt. He led the side to a third-place finish, and achieved a points total of 80, the highest the club had recorded since its promotion to the Football League. In July 2011, after much argument and debate, Wycombe District Council announced that work on the community stadium proposed at Wycombe Air Park would stop.

Wycombe Wanderers kicked off their 2011–12 League One season on 6 August 2011, with a 1–1 draw against Scunthorpe United at home. However, Wycombe were relegated back to League Two on 28 April 2012, after a 4–3 home defeat to Notts County.

Wycombe Wanderers Trust ownership and rise to the Championship (2012–2021)
On 30 June 2012, the Wycombe Wanderers Trust (Supporter owned) formally took over the club. This financial stabilisation ended a transfer embargo. Gary Waddock took advantage of this immediately and signed several new players for the 2012–13 season. The season also included their 125th anniversary, and the shirt design was an adaptation of their first-ever kit, in Oxford and Cambridge Blue halves (instead of quarters).

Wycombe kicked off their new season in League Two with a 3–1 victory away at York City. Despite this strong start, Wycombe went through a bad period soon after and for a while sat just above the relegation zone in League Two. On 22 September 2012, after Wycombe's third successive defeat, Waddock was sacked as manager with immediate effect.

Former club captain, Gareth Ainsworth was immediately named as the caretaker manager in Waddock's absence. Just over a month later, on 8 November 2012, Ainsworth was named as Wycombe's permanent manager. He signed a contract, lasting for the rest of the season. Ainsworth revitalised the squad and the club as a whole, and steered Wycombe safely away from the relegation threat. Wycombe eventually ended the season in 15th place, nine points clear of relegation. At the end of the season, Wycombe's player-manager Gareth Ainsworth announced his retirement from professional football (after an 18-year career), although he signed a new two-year contract as Wycombe manager.

At the start of the final day of the 2013–14 season, Wycombe were three points adrift of safety in the relegation zone of League Two. However, after a 3–0 win away at Torquay, and Bristol Rovers losing to Mansfield Town, Wycombe finished in 22nd place, above Bristol on goal difference, to remain in the Football League.

Following the near-relegation of the previous season, Gareth Ainsworth released seven players from the club, including defender Leon Johnson who had made 200 appearances in 7 years. During the summer break, Ainsworth rebuilt his squad, with the addition of Paul Hayes for a second spell at the club. The 2014–15 season saw the club spend the majority of the season in the automatic promotion places. However, two costly home defeats to Morecambe and local rivals Oxford United led to a finishing position of 4th, setting up a play-off fixture against Plymouth Argyle. The play-off final took place on 23 May and within five seconds of kick-off Wycombe midfielder Sam Saunders pulled his calf muscle and had to be substituted for Matt Bloomfield in the fourth minute. During the regular 90 minutes both teams had a goal disallowed, but neither managed to score. Four minutes into extra time Wycombe were awarded a free kick just outside the Southend penalty area. Joe Jacobson took the free kick and the ball rebounded off keeper Daniel Bentley and into the net. Southend continued to put pressure on Wycombe until Joe Pigott scored in the 122nd minute to tie the game at 1–1 and send it to a penalty shoot out. Southend won the shoot out 7–6 when Sam Wood's effort was saved by Bentley.

In the 2017–18 season, Exeter and Notts County both losing respectively combined with Wycombe winning their penultimate game of the season ensured promotion to EFL League One, joining Luton Town and EFL League Two champions Accrington Stanley. In the 2019–20 season, Wycombe finished 3rd in League One on points per game due to the impact of COVID-19. They won the play-off semi final 6–3 on aggregate, against Fleetwood Town, then, on 13 July beat Oxford United 2–1 in the final, at an empty Wembley Stadium, to ensure that Wycombe would play in the EFL Championship for the first time in the club's history.

The 2020–21 Championship season was a learning experience for everyone involved with the club. With all but three of the 46 League matches being played behind closed doors due to the continuing COVID-19 pandemic, Wycombe struggled in the early stages, failing to register a point in their first seven League outings, and failing to score in their first four. An improved run of form, which included back-to-back wins against Sheffield Wednesday and Birmingham City, lifted Wycombe to 22nd in the table, but three successive defeats in December saw the club drop to bottom position on the Saturday before Christmas. The indifferent form continued into the New Year, but a fourth round FA Cup tie at home to Tottenham Hotspur proved a welcome distraction, with Wycombe taking the lead through Fred Onyedinma in the first half, before the Premier League club found their form to win the tie 4–1. Still bottom of the table going into the Easter period, Wycombe's fortunes then began to turn around significantly, and they still had a theoretical outside chance of survival going into the final game away at Middlesbrough. A 3–0 win was not enough, but results elsewhere meant that Wycombe finished the season in 22nd place with 43 points, 16 of which had been gained from the final eight games. The club was therefore relegated back to League One, but only by a margin of one point and an inferior goal difference to Derby County. After Derby County, previously accused of breaching financial fair play regulations, went into administration in September 2021, Wycombe considered legal action to recoup potential losses of up to £20m.

League One Consistency and a New Managerial Era (2023–) 
After many rumours of Gareth Ainsworth's departure surfacing due to QPR sacking of Neil Critchley, he signed for QPR on 21 February 2023 on a 3.5 year contract. The club quickly sought a replacement in former Wycombe club captain Matt Bloomfield. Bloomfield had just won the Manager of the Month for January at Colchester United, a club he had joined from Wycombe just four months earlier. Bloomfield officially signed for Wycombe the following day. Ainsworth's departure marked the end of a period of unprecedented success for the club. During his time he took the club from the bottom of League Two to the Championship for the first time in their history.

Stadium

Wycombe's stadium is known as Adams Park, and is located on the edge of an industrial estate in the Sands area of High Wycombe. The stadium was named Adams Park in honour of benefactor and former captain Frank Adams. The club has played at the stadium since 1990; the move from its previous ground Loakes Park was financed almost solely by the sale of Loakes Park to the health authorities in order to facilitate the expansion of Wycombe Hospital.

During the 2003–04 and 2004–05 seasons, the stadium was known as "The Causeway Stadium" for sponsorship reasons.

The stadium has a current capacity of 9,558 with four stands. The original seated Main Stand (Origin Stand) is on the north side of the stadium, with a capacity of 1,248. The largest stand in the stadium is the Woodlands Stand on the south side of the ground, which was built in 1996, replacing a covered terrace. It has three tiers; the upper tier is known as the Frank Adams Stand (like the stadium, named after former captain Frank Adams), with a capacity of 2,842; the middle tier contains 20 executive boxes, plus the Woodlands Lounge, and has a capacity of 360; the lower tier is the Family Stand, with a capacity of 1,777. The stand therefore has a total capacity of 4,979. At one end of the Family Stand are 60 so-called "2020" seats, which can be used by both seated and standing spectators. The away section of the stadium, on the east side, is the Hillbottom Stand (Troo Stand) with a usable capacity of 1,866 (although the physical seating capacity is actually 2,057). This stand was rebuilt in 2001, almost doubling its previous size. The stadium also has one terrace, on the west side, which is the Valley Terrace (Whites Beaconsfield Terrace). This is the home supporters' end, with a capacity of 1,429. In addition, there are 36 places in the stadium not accounted for above.

The main supporters' bars at the stadium are the Woodlands Lounge, the Caledonian Suite (formerly the Vere Suite), and Monty's (formerly the Centre Spot, then Scores). The new club shop was built in 2006, replacing the portable buildings that previously served as the shop; it was reconfigured in 2015 along with the main reception area, and again in 2020.

Wycombe Wanderers also shared the stadium with Aviva Premiership Rugby Union team Wasps (then known as London Wasps) between 2002 and 2014.

Rivalries
As a non-League club, Slough Town were considered Wycombe's fiercest local rivals. A rivalry with the more distant Colchester United also exists due to the two clubs battling to win promotion to the Football League in the early 1990s.
Since becoming a Football League club, the Chairboys have also built on and off again rivalries with neighbouring clubs Oxford United, Milton Keynes Dons, Luton Town, and Reading.

Attendances
The club's average home league attendances since 1980–81 (* = approximate figure, ^ = season curtailed (18 home games), ¬ = limited spectator attendance (2 home games)).

Players

Current squad

Out on loan

Retired numbers

 (posthumous)

Former players
See also::Category:Wycombe Wanderers F.C. players – a list of all Wycombe Wanderers players with a Wikipedia article.
See also:List Of Wycombe Wanderers F.C. Players – a list of all Wycombe Wanderers players with 250 or more appearances for the club.

Footballing and medical staff

Board of directors

History
1896–97 – Joined Southern League Division Two.
1908–09 – Joined Great Western Suburban League.
1919–20 – Joined Spartan League.
1921–22 – Joined Isthmian League after two successive Spartan League titles.
1930–31 – FA Amateur Cup Winners.
1953–54 – Missed runner-up spot in Isthmian League on goal average.
1955–56 – Isthmian League Champions.
1956–57 – Isthmian League Champions (2nd time); FA Amateur Cup runner-up.
1957–58 – Isthmian League runner-up.
1959–60 – Isthmian League runner-up.
1969–70 – Isthmian League runner-up.
1970–71 – Isthmian League Champions (3rd time).
1971–72 – Isthmian League Champions (4th time).
1973–74 – Isthmian League Champions (5th time).
1974–75 – Isthmian League Champions (6th time) (on goal average).
1975–76 – Isthmian League runner-up. Winner of the Anglo-Italian Semiprofessional Cup
1976–77 – Isthmian League runner-up.
1978–79 – Rejected invitation to join the Alliance Premier League.
1980–81 – Rejected invitation to join the Alliance Premier League.
1981–82 – FA Trophy semi-finalists.
1982–83 – Isthmian League Champions (7th time) rejected promotion to the Alliance Premier League.
1985–86 – Joined Alliance Premier League, relegated after one season.
1986–87 – Rejoined Isthmian League; Isthmian League Champions (8th time).
1987–88 – Rejoined Conference (ex-Alliance Premier League).
1990–91 – FA Trophy Winners.
1991–92 – Conference runner-up (missed title and promotion to Football League on goal difference).
1992–93 – Conference Champions; FA Trophy Winners (2nd time); Promoted to Football League Division Three.
1993–94 – Promoted to Division Two after play-offs (Final – Wycombe Wanderers 4 Preston North End 2 at Wembley Stadium).
2000–01 – FA Cup semi-finalists.
2003–04 – Relegated to Division Three, which was then renamed "League Two".
2005–06 – Not promoted after play-offs (SF Wycombe Wanderers 1 Cheltenham Town 2, Cheltenham Town 0 Wycombe Wanderers 0 – Aggregate 1–2).
2006–07 – League Cup semi-finalists, beating Premiership Charlton Athletic and Fulham away from home, and finally falling 5–1 to Champions Chelsea on aggregate, following a 1–1 draw at Adams Park.
2007–08 – Not promoted after play-offs (SF Wycombe Wanderers 1 Stockport County 1, Stockport County 1 Wycombe Wanderers 0 – Aggregate 1–2).
2008–09 – Promoted to League One after finishing in third place (above fourth-placed Bury on goal difference by a single goal).
2009–10 – Relegated to League Two.
2009–10 – Football League Family Excellence Award.
2010–11 – Promoted to League One after finishing in third place (above fourth-placed Shrewsbury Town by one point).
2011–12 – Relegated to League Two.
2011–12 – Football League Family Excellence Award.
2013–14 – Escaped relegation to Conference on goal difference.
2014–15 – Not promoted after play-offs (SF Plymouth Argyle 2 Wycombe Wanderers 3, Wycombe Wanderers 2 Plymouth Argyle 1 – Aggregate 5–3, F Southend United 1 Wycombe Wanderers 1 at Wembley Stadium, Southend United won 7–6 on penalties).
2017–18 – Promoted to League One a week before their final game against Stevenage after winning against Chesterfield combined with losses for both Exeter City and Notts County in the two places immediately below them.
2019–20 – Promoted to Championship after play-offs (Final – Oxford United 1 Wycombe Wanderers 2 at Wembley Stadium).
2020–21 – Relegated to League One.
Source:

Coaches (until 1968) and managers

Honours

League 
League One (Tier 3)
Play-off winners: 2019–20
Play-off runners-up: 2021–22
League Two/Third Division (Tier 4)
Third place (Promoted): 2008–09, 2010–11, 2017–18
Play-off winners: 1993–94
Play-off runners-up: 2014–15
Conference (Tier 5)
Champions: 1992–93
Runners-up: 1991–92
Isthmian League
Champions: 1955–56, 1956–57, 1970–71, 1971–72, 1973–74, 1974–75, 1982–83, 1986–87
Spartan League
Champions: 1919–20, 1920–21
London Fives
Champions: 1994, 1995

Cups

Football League Trophy
Southern Area finalists: 1993–94
FA Trophy
Winners: 1990–91, 1992–93
Football Conference Shield
Winners: 1991–92, 1992–93, 1993–94
Football Conference Charity Shield
Winners: 1987–88
FA Amateur Cup
Winners: 1930–31
Runners-up: 1956–57
Youth Alliance Cup
Winners: 2010–11
Anglo-Italian semi-professional cup
Winners: 1975

Awards
FA Cup Giant Killers Award: 2000–01

References

External links

 Official website
 Official Wycombe Wanderers Supporters Association website
 Wycombe Wanderers Independent Supporters Club website 
 Chairboys On The Net (includes season by season archive)
 Gasroom (original fans' forum)
 Gasroom 2.1 (new fans' forum)
 Wycombe Wanderers Archive
 Supporters Trust website
 Wycombe Wanderers F.C. on BBC Sport
 Wycombe Wanderers F.C. on BT Sport
 Wycombe Wanderers F.C. on Sky Sports
 Every match result and league table since joining the Football League

 
Association football clubs established in 1887
Southern Football League clubs
Spartan League
Great Western Combination
Isthmian League
National League (English football) clubs
English Football League clubs
High Wycombe
1887 establishments in England
Great Western Suburban League
Fan-owned football clubs in England